For the similarly named reservoirs in Afghanistan, please see Aodan (reservoir).''Aodan''' is the name of a village in Afghanistan. It is in Andarab District of Baghlan Province, and located in the Shashan Tagao. Around the turn of the twentieth century, it contained 10 Tajik households.

See also 
Baghlan Province

References

Populated places in Baghlan Province